Cham Chareh Du (also Romanized as Cham Chareh Dū, meaning "Cham Chareh 2") is a village in Dowreh Rural District, Chegeni District, Dowreh County, Lorestan Province, Iran. At the 2006 census, its population was 35, in 10 families.

References 

Towns and villages in Dowreh County